Sydney Edward Cambrian Ancher ARAIA ARIBA (25 February 19048 December 1979), was an Australian architect from Woollahra, Sydney. His  fascination with Europe contributed to the introduction of European internationalism in Australia. He also had a significant impact on the establishment of modern domestic architecture.

Early life 
Sydney Ancher was the son of New Zealand journalist Edward Albert Ancher and his Australian wife Ethel Puah, née Parsons. He was educated at Mosman Superior Public, North Sydney Boys’ High and Sydney Technical High School.

Notable Projects 
 Prevost House, Sydney, NSW, 1935 [1]
 Ancher House, 3 Maytone Avenue, Killara, NSW, 1945 [2] 
 Farley House, North Curl Curl, NSW, 1948 [3]
 House, Killeaton Street, St Ives, NSW, 1950 [4]
 Sydney Ancher House, Sydney, NSW, 1957 [5]

Family life
On 26 November 1926 he married Aaletha Ethel Hasemer, a stenographer, at the Presbyterian Church, Mosman, Australia.

Retirement
Ancher retired in 1966. His wife died in 1970 and he died on 8 December 1979 in hospital at Waratah. He was cremated.

References 

 http://sydneyarchitecture.com/ARCH/ARCH-Ancher.htm
 http://www.architecture.com.au/docs/default-source/nsw-notable-buildings/ancher-house-iii.pdf
 http://douglas-snelling.com/timeline/
 http://sydneyarchitecture.com/ARCH/ARCH-Ancher.htm
 http://www.penrithregionalgallery.org/aboutus-architecture.php
 http://adb.anu.edu.au/biography/ancher-sydney-edward-cambrian-9348
 http://www.canberrahouse.com/2006/11/08/sydney-ancher/
 Ancher, Mortlock, Murray, Woolley : Sydney Architects 1946-1976, David Saunders, Sydney: Power Institute of Fine Arts, University of Sydney,1967

1904 births
1979 deaths
Associates of the Royal Institute of British Architects
20th-century Australian architects
Recipients of the Royal Australian Institute of Architects’ Gold Medal